Jorge Merino Mazón (born 10 June 1991) is a Spanish footballer who plays for Italian club A.S.D. Serpentara Bellegra as a midfielder.

Football career
Born in Santander, Cantabria. Merino graduated from Atlético Madrid, and spent his first year as a senior with local SD Noja. In the 2011 summer he moved to CF Vimenor, also in Tercera División.

On 27 January 2012 Merino joined Recreativo de Huelva, initially assigned to the reserves in the same division. On 8 June 2013 he first appeared for the main squad, playing roughly 20 minutes in a 0–0 home draw against SD Huesca in the Segunda División.

On 5 August 2014 Merino joined Segunda División B's Marino de Luanco. On 2 October of the following year he moved abroad for the first time in his career, joining Italian Serie D side A.S.D. Serpentara Bellegra.

References

External links

1991 births
Living people
Spanish footballers
Footballers from Santander, Spain
Association football midfielders
Segunda División players
Segunda División B players
Tercera División players
Atlético Onubense players
Recreativo de Huelva players
Marino de Luanco footballers
Spanish expatriate footballers
Spanish expatriate sportspeople in Italy
Expatriate footballers in Italy